Ranga Dissanayake (born 23 September 1979) is a Sri Lankan cricketer. He made his first-class debut in the 2001–01 season, his List A debut in the 2001–02 season, and later made his Twenty20 debut for Sri Lanka Air Force Sports Club in the 2015-16 AIA Premier T20 Tournament on 1 April 2015.

References

External links
 

1979 births
Living people
Sri Lankan cricketers
Sri Lanka Air Force Sports Club cricketers
Cricketers from Kandy